Dwyka may refer to:

Dwyka River, a river in the Karoo region of South Africa
Dwyka Group, a group of sedimentary geological formations in Southern Africa